The Lebanon national under-17 football team is the national under-17 football team of Lebanon and is controlled by the Lebanese Football Association. The team also serves as the national under-16 and national under-15 football teams of Lebanon. 

While the team is yet to qualify for both the FIFA U-17 World Cup and the AFC U-17 Asian Cup, they participate in the Arab Cup U-17 and WAFF U-16 Championship. Lebanon reached the final of the 2022 WAFF U-16 Championship, losing 1–0 to hosts Jordan. The team has produced several senior nationals, such as Hussein El Dor, Omar El Kurdi, Jad Noureddine and Mohamad Kdouh.

Competitive record

FIFA U-17 World Cup

AFC U-17 Asian Cup

Arab Cup U-17

WAFF U-16 Championship

Recent results and fixtures

2021

2022

Players

Current squad
The following 23 players were called up for the 2023 AFC U-17 Asian Cup qualification.

Recent call-ups
The following footballers were part of a national selection in the past 12 months, but are not part of the current squad.

See also
Lebanon men's national football team
Lebanon men's national under-23 football team
Lebanon men's national under-20 football team
Lebanon women's national football team
Lebanon women's national under-20 football team
Lebanon women's national under-17 football team
Football in Lebanon

References

U17
Asian national under-17 association football teams
Youth football in Lebanon